Manuel María Blanco Ramos known as Manuel Blanco (1779 – 1845) was a Spanish friar and botanist.

Biography
Born in Navianos de Alba, Castilla y León, Spain, Blanco was a member of the Augustinian order of friars. His first assignment was in Angat in the province of Bulacan in the Philippines. He subsequently had a variety different assignments.

Towards the end of his life, he became the delegate of his order in Manila, traveling throughout the archipelago. He is the author of one of the first comprehensive flora of the Philippines, Flora de Filipinas. Según el sistema de Linneo (Flora of the Philippines according to the system of Linnaeus) which  followed after the work done by Georg Joseph Kamel. The first two editions (Manila, 1837 and 1845) were unillustrated. Celestine Fernandez Villar (1838-1907), together with others including Antonio Llanos, published an illustrated posthumous edition from 1877 to 1883, printed by C. Verdaguer of Barcelona.

Blanco died in Manila in 1845. The botanist Carl Ludwig Blume (1789-1862) named the genus Blancoa of the family Palmae in his honor.

Books
Flora de Filipinas. Según el sistema sexual de Linneo, Manila: 1837.
Flora de Filipinas. Según el sistema sexual de Linneo... Segunda impression &c., Manila: 1845.
Flora de Filipinas, según el sistema sexual de Linneo. Adicionada con el manuscrito inédito del. fr. Ignacio Mercado, las obras del fr. Antonio Llanos, y de un apéndice con todas las nuevas investigaciones botanicas referentes al archipiélago Filifino [sic]. Gran edicion., Manila: 1877-1883

References

Bibliography
Biography at Royal Academy of the History of Spain
Biography at Nationaal Herbarium Nederland
 Plates from Flora de Filipinas at Wikimedia Commons.

External links

 

Botanists active in the Philippines
Spanish expatriates in the Philippines
19th-century Spanish botanists
Botanists with author abbreviations
1779 births
1845 deaths
Augustinian friars
Missionary botanists